Elliot Ho Yat Leung is the first and only composer from Hong Kong to break into Hollywood. He is best known for his work on Operation Red Sea, The Battle at Lake Changjin and The Rescue. He has composed the score for 3 of the top 10 highest-grossing non-English films with his films grossing over 2 billion USD, making him one of the highest grossing composers in Asia. His works have been performed in many prestigious venues, namely the National Centre for the Performing Arts (China), Hong Kong Cultural Centre and the Queen Elizabeth Stadium. He was named on the Forbes 30 Under 30 list in 2022.

Early life 
Leung was born and raised in British Hong Kong, the eldest of two children to a father who had dreams to be a visual artist and a mother who wanted to pursue a musical career. His mother plays piano and was a first chorale soprano, then a choir conductor. He received early music education in St. Paul's Co-educational College and the Hong Kong Academy of Performing Arts, and transferred to International Christian School in his secondary years. He later furthered his studies in Wheaton Conservatory of Music and graduated with a Bachelor degree in Music Composition.

When Leung was two years old, his mother began teaching him how to play the piano. When he turned five, his swift musical growth was quickly identified by teachers of St. Paul's Co-educational College. The next year, Leung was sent to study music and the cello with former Principal Cellist of the Hong Kong Sinfonietta, Laurent Perrin. When he was fifteen, Leung made his debut appearance on CCTV's "Charming China Youth Arts Festival (亞洲藝術盛典 · 魅力中國)" show. As a child, Leung aspired to be an orchestra conductor until encountering the music from Halo: Combat Evolved during his teens, driving him to pursue another career that revolves around symphonic music.

Leung was mentored by Martin O'Donnell when he traveled to the United States to further his musical pursuits. O'Donnell's modal music was a musical influence throughout Leung's upbringing. In an interview, Leung commented that his original post-college intentions were to follow O'Donnell's footsteps and pursue graduate studies in music at the University of Southern California until he was scouted and named the composer of Operation Red Sea.

Career

2014 to 2017: Beginnings in Hong Kong 
Leung's first job in the film industry was working as a composer assistant on the film "Insanity" in 2014. In 2015, he started scoring various kinds of media while continuing to work as an orchestrator. During this time, his choral music was highly praised by Bernard Chan of the Hong Kong Executive Council. He also composed RTHK radio 1's new station jingle. His arrangement of "Descendants of the Dragon" (龍的傳人) was also performed in "同心耀中華 — 紫荊花開," held in Shenzhen as the concert finale as a part of the Hong Kong SAR's 20th Anniversary celebrations.

Leung's breakthrough came in 2017, when Dante Lam asked him to compose the score of Operation Red Sea (紅海行動). The film was selected to represent Hong Kong in the best foreign-language film category at the 91st Academy Awards.

2017 - 2021: Breakthrough and Acclaim in the Chinese Film Industry 
Leung's work on Operation Red Sea was highly acclaimed. Alex Lines from Film Inquiry called it "a score that invigorates life"  while Jonathan Broxton of Movie Music UK wrote:The score is by the very talented young Hong Kong-based composer Elliot Leung; this is the first score of his I have heard, but on this evidence I’m very impressed. What I like about Leung’s writing is how much energy and inventiveness it has. It uses a full orchestra and a whole host of throbbing, pulsating electronic loops and beats, but despite the fact that it sits firmly within a now familiar sonic world, Leung does so much with it, rhythmically and thematically. [The writing is] outstanding, full of interesting and unexpectedly creative string ostinatos, unique-sounding electronic elements, and regular outbursts of brass-led power. The main reason I enjoy Operation Red Sea so much is because I want people like Lorne Balfe and Tom Holkenborg to write for their contemporary action movies, and why I’m so disappointed when those big names so often show such a lack of creativity and musical ambition. Bravo to Elliot Leung for proving that you <I>can</I> write music in that style, but still do it with flair and panache. Following the success of his breakthrough score, Leung was invited to write for "The Rescue," and was involved in the production since pre-production. After numerous delays due to the COVID-19 pandemic, the score was finally released internationally by Milan Records and Sony Classical on December 18, 2020. Many of Leung's pieces from these films, such as "The Valiant Flight" and "Operation Red Sea Concert Suite" have been performed on numerous occasions, such as the 8th Beijing International Film Festival and the 1st Foshan Film Festival.

Leung's prowess was quickly discovered by the video game industry. After Tencent Games invited him to compose for Honor of Kings, the highest-grossing mobile game of all-time, ByteDance invited him to compose for Dragonheir: Silent Gods  and Moonton Games invited him to compose for Mobile Legends: Bang Bang.

In 2021, Leung composed the theme and the score for The Battle at Lake Changjin, the second-highest-grossing film of 2021; the highest-grossing film in Chinese cinema history; and the highest-grossing non-English film of all time. Leung was invited to return for the sequel, The Battle at Lake Changjin II.

2022-Present: Hollywood and the Metaverse Symphony 
In 2022, Leung was listed on the Forbes' 2022 30 under 30. After writing for Disney+ series Anita, Leung decided to return to his classical roots and began a yearlong journey composing his Symphony No. 1 "The Metaverse," while relocating to Los Angeles in a bid to break into Hollywood. The symphony was commissioned by the Hong Kong Philharmonic Orchestra and the Asia Society as the world's first symphony work to be premiered both in a concert hall and in the Sandbox. In early 2022, Leung signed with Kraft-Engel Management and started working on Hollywood projects, making him the first composer from Hong Kong to break into Hollywood. In September 2022, Leung was announced as the composer of Six Days in Fallujah by Victura and Highwire Games and a currently unreleased Hollywood film.

Discography

Theatrical Films

Television Series

Video Games

Awards and nominations

Concert Music

References

External links 
 Elliot Leung official website
 Elliot Leung on IMDb
 Elliot Leung on HKMDB

Living people
Chinese film score composers
Chinese composers
Male film score composers
Hong Kong composers
Hong Kong male composers
Wheaton College (Illinois) alumni
1995 births